"Mistletoe and Holly" is a 1957 Christmas song recorded and co-written by Frank Sinatra. The song was released as a single on Capitol Records.  The lyrics discuss some of the traditions of celebrating Christmas:  giving the tree the trim, carols by starlight, granny's pies and merry greetings from relatives you don't know.

Background
The song was written by Frank Sinatra, Dok Stanford and Hank Sanicola, and published by the Barton Music Corporation in New York. "Mistletoe and Holly" with Orchestra Conducted by Gordon Jenkins was released as a Capitol 7" 45 single in 1957 as F3900 and as a 10" 78 backed with "The Christmas Waltz" with The Ralph Brewster Singers. The single did not chart. The song was also released as a 7" 45 EP release: Jolly Christmas from Frank Sinatra, Parts 1–3, Capitol EAP 1-3-894, in mono. Capitol also released the song as a special 7" 45 single release as "The Christmas Seal Song" with an introduction by Sinatra as PRO 1707 in 1960.

The song was selected as the theme song for the 1960 Christmas Seals appeal.

The song was remixed by Kaskade.

Album appearances
The song appeared on the 1957 Capitol Christmas album A Jolly Christmas from Frank Sinatra, the Capitol LP The Sinatra Christmas Album in 1963, the Concepts collection on Capitol in 1992, the Capitol CD album The Complete Capitol Singles Collection in 1996, and the 2002 Christmas release Christmas with the Rat Pack.

Personnel
The song was recorded on July 17, 1957 in Los Angeles. The personnel on the session were: Frank Sinatra (leader), Gordon Jenkins (conductor), Phil Ramone (producer), Allan Reuss (guitar), Nat Gangursky, John Ryan (bass), Bill Miller (piano), Kathryn Thompson (harp), Ralph Hancoll (drums), Victor Arno, Walter Edelstein, David Frisina, Sol Kindler, Joseph Livoti, Nick Pisani, Joseph Quadri, Lou Raderman, Mischa Russell, Marshall Sosson (violin), Bill Baffa, Louis Kievman, Paul Robyn, Dave Sterkin (viola), Cy Bernard, Armond Kaproff (cello), Frank Sinatra (vocal), Betty Allen, Sue Allen, Ralph Brewster, The Ralph Brewster Singers, Peggy Clark, Barbara Ford, Lee Gotch, Beverly Jenkins, Jimmy Joyce, Gene Lanham (né Eugene Prentiss Lanham; 1915–1977), Bill Lee, Ray Linn, Jr., John Mann, Thora Mathiason, Dorothy McCarty (née Dorothy Dee McCarty; 1917–2015), Loulie Jean Norman, Betty Noyes, Thurl Ravenscroft, Ginny Roos, Max Smith, Bob Stevens, Bill Thompson, Robert Wacker, Betty Wand, and Gloria Wood (chorus or choir).

Charts

Other recordings
Jack Jones – The Jack Jones Christmas Album (1964) 
The Gunter Kallmann Choir – Christmas Sing-In (1970) Medley with "Let It Snow! Let It Snow! Let It Snow!"
Leigh Nash – Sounds of the Season NBC 2005 (2005) 
Robert Davi – Salvation Army benefit single (2011) 
Charlie Byrd – The Charlie Byrd Christmas Album (1982)
Faith Evans – A Faithful Christmas (2005) 
Beegie Adair – Winter Romance (2009)
Joey DeFrancesco – Home for the Holidays (2014)
Kidz Bop Kids – Kidz Bop Christmas Wish List (2014)

References

Sources
Granata, Charles L. (1999). Sessions with Sinatra: Frank Sinatra and the Art of Recording. Chicago Review Press.  
Phasey, Chris (1995). Francis Albert Sinatra: Tracked Down (Discography). Buckland Publications. 
Summers, Antony and Swan, Robbyn (2005). Sinatra: The Life. Doubleday. 

Frank Sinatra songs
American Christmas songs
1957 songs
Songs written by Frank Sinatra
Capitol Records singles
Songs written by Hank Sanicola